Erwin Wilhelm Schulz (27 November 1900 – 11 November 1981) was a German member of the Gestapo and the SS in Nazi Germany. He was the leader of Einsatzkommando 5, part of Einsatzgruppe C, which was attached to the Army Group South during the planned invasion of Soviet Union in 1941, and operated in the occupied territories of south-eastern Poland and Ukrainian SSR committing mass killings of civilian population, mostly of Jewish ethnicity, under the command of SS-Brigadeführer Otto Rasch.

Career
In April 1918, Schulz, then 17, volunteered for service in the Imperial German Army. However, World War I ended before he saw combat. Schulz was discharged in 1919.

Schulz never received a doctorate in law, although some Nazis called him Dr. Schulz. He studied law only for two semesters in Berlin but left university to join the Freikorps in 1922. For a time, he worked in a bank and relocated to Hamburg in 1923. He joined the uniformed police force (Schutzpolizei) in Bremen, and in 1926 was appointed a police lieutenant. In 1931 he was an informant for the SS. He officially joined the Nazi Party in May 1933 and in November was appointed head of the Gestapo of Bremen. In 1935 he joined the SS and SD. In March 1938 he was promoted to SS-Major (Sturmbannführer) and State Councillor for the state of Bremen. In April 1940 he was inspector-instructor of cadets of the SiPo and SD at Charlottenburg.

In May 1941 Schulz was appointed chief of Einsatzkommando (mission squad) 5. The unit departed Germany in June 1941, and arrived in Ukraine in early July 1941. He presided over the executions of 90 to 100 people in Lviv in July 1941. When he convened with Otto Rasch at Zhytomyr on 10 August 1941, Rasch informed him that on the orders of Adolf Hitler, more Jews needed to be shot. The Senior SS and police leader for occupied Eastern Russia Friedrich Jeckeln ordered that all Jews not engaged in forced labor, including women and children, were to be slaughtered. Schulz summarized the meeting:

Shortly thereafter he questioned both Bruno Streckenbach and Reinhard Heydrich on this point; it was confirmed that this order had come from Hitler. Schulz asked to be relieved of his post, saying he could not handle this kind of job. Schulz's colleagues called him soft for being unable to stomach the mass slaughter of unarmed women and children. On 24 August 1941, he left for Berlin, arriving there three days later. He was promoted to SS-Oberführer, and appointed deputy to Erwin Rösener, SS and Police Leader and commander of SS-Oberabschnitt Alpenland from 1 to 28 May 1944. Arrested by the Allies, Schulz wrote a letter to Lucius D. Clay, deputy to General Dwight D. Eisenhower, requesting clemency.

At the Einsatzgruppen Trial, Schulz claimed that the Lviv executions carried out by his men were legal. He said he had been told that the Russians had massacred about 5000 Ukrainians and Poles before fleeing (in reality, it had been perpetrated by Ukrainian nationalists). Schulz also claimed that German soldiers had been murdered, but could not say how many. Lastly, Schulz said he had freed 2000 detainees held in a stadium in Lviv after witnessing them being abused by Wehrmacht troops. All of these detainees were able to escape.

The court cast doubt on Schulz's defense for the executions, saying the documents listed the shootings as reprisals. These had been revenge killings, which meant that the Einsatzkommando leaders had not conducted thorough investigations or trials, making the executions illegal. The court also pointed out that while Schulz was on duty in Russia on 9 August 1941, his men had shot 400 Jews, described as mostly "saboteurs and political functionaries". Schulz's men shot another 74 Jews up until this date.

From 24 and 30 August, Schulz's men executed 157 people, the victims being "Jews, officials, and saboteurs." Schulz used his trip to Berlin as an alibi for these executions. However, the court said this did not necessarily exonerate him since they might've been planned in advance.

Another document stated that between 31 August and 6 September 1941, Schulz's men reported the "liquidation of 90 political officials, 72 saboteurs and looters, and 161 Jews." Schulz's lawyer claimed that the Jews were not listed as criminals since high command had ordered that the Jews not to be listed as "saboteurs, plunderers, etc" in reports. The court rejected this, saying other evidence showed the Jews had been shot simply for being Jews. They acknowledged that Schulz had been in Berlin at the time of these shootings, but pointed out that he was still in command of the unit.

Schulz was found guilty on all counts. However, he was spared execution on the grounds that he had made an effort to oppose the "intolerable situation", then resigned when he could not stop what was happening. Schulz was sentenced to 20 years in prison instead. This sentence was reviewed by the "Peck Panel" and commuted to 15 years in prison in January 1951. Schulz was paroled on 9 January 1954. He died in 1981.

In an interview, Schulz said that serving in the Einsatzgruppen was entirely voluntary:"I never knew of any cases where members or heads of the Einsatzkommandos acted in the same way as I did. I believe that things in Russia would never have turned out as they did had a few heads of the Einsatzkommandos and Einsatzgruppen declared that they could not carry out these liquidations. The way I see it, the same applies... to the Wehrmacht commanders in whose areas of command the liquidations were carried out of the avalanche could have still been checked if a field marshal or the commanding officer of any army group had intervened. I do not know of or recall any order that stated that SS chiefs or members of the SD or the police would be sent to concentration camps if they refused to carry out an order. I also never heard of such an order during the course of the conversations I had on the subject or indeed from rumors."

References

1900 births
1981 deaths
Military personnel from Berlin
20th-century Freikorps personnel
Einsatzgruppen personnel
German people convicted of crimes against humanity
German Army personnel of World War I
Gestapo personnel
People convicted by the United States Nuremberg Military Tribunals
Reich Security Main Office personnel
SS-Brigadeführer
Holocaust perpetrators in Ukraine
Holocaust perpetrators in Russia